Wittmund is a town and capital of the district of Wittmund, in Lower Saxony, Germany.

Geography
Wittmund is a town of 21,000 inhabitants located in Germany's historic coastal district of East Frisia, between the towns of Aurich and Jever.

Harlesiel is named after the Harle, a small river that starts and finishes within Wittmund borough. (A siel is a sluice in a dyke. At low tide, water from the river may flow into the sea.)

Villages:
- Ardorf
- Asel
- Blersum
- Berdum
- Burhafe
- Buttforde
- Carolinensiel
- Eggelingen
- Funnix
- Hovel
- Leerhafe
- Uttel
- Willen

Towns:
- Wittmund

Mayor
Since  November 1, 2006, Rolf Claußen is the mayor of Wittmund. He was reelected in 2014.

History
The town of Wittmund, on the edge of the geest, and its surroundings are an ancient area of settlement. It was linked to inland East Frisia's network of roads early on and commercially oriented to the nearby coast. Around 1200, Wittmund was the hub of the rural parish (Landgemeinde) of Wangerland and was called Wiedemund or Wiedemundheim at that time. The territorial units of the rural parishes were based roughly on old Frisian districts. Esens was the administrative centre of the Harlingerland.

The chieftain family of Kankena lived in a castle in the town in the late 14th century. Around 1400, Hamburg forces occupied the castle grounds as a result of allegations that the Kankenas had supported piracy against the Hanseatic city. The release of the castle into the hands of the ruling chieftain family of tom Brok saw the Kankenas regaining possession of their estate.

The subsequent ruler of the Brokmerland, Focko Ukena, cleverly took advantage of the weakness of the Kankenas and enlisted them for military operations in the Battle of the Wild Fields, which he won. In 1454 the castle fell to the ruler of Harlingerland, Sibet Attena. In the same year, Sibet Attena united the rulers of Esens, Stedesdorf and Wittmund in order to ensure the independence of Harlingerland against the East Frisian counts. Not until 1600 was the Harlingerland, including Wittmund, finally joined to East Frisia through political and family mergers.

In 1584, the place is recorded on a card as Witmondt. Later, the town was given a district (Amt) constitution and made into an Amt as part of the new comital order. In 1730 Witmundt is recorded within the Amt of Witmundt on another map. In 1744, East Frisia was absorbed by Prussia, and then, after a brief period under Dutch/French rule, became part of the Kingdom of Hanover in 1815.

Under Hanoverian rule, the Landdrostei emerged, with the Landdrost as the highest state representative in the province. In 1866, East Frisia once again became part of Prussia. The state of Prussia initially took over the Amt structure with its existing Ämter of Aurich, Berum, Emden, Esens, Leer, Stickhausen, Weener and Wittmund. From 1884 they were transferred into the new district (Landkreis) structure. In East Frisia the new districts of Aurich, Emden (independent), Leer, Norden, Weener and Wittmund (1885) were created. Even the former Hanoverian Landdrostei were transformed into administrative provinces (Regierungsbezirke). The district hall was built in Wittmund in 1903.

Wittmund was given town rights as early as 1567 by Agnes, Countess of Rietberg. In the 17th century these rights were rescinded and were not granted again until 1929.

The Luftwaffe's 71st Tactical Fighter Squadron ( Taktisches Luftwaffengeschwader 71 "Richthofen") is based at Wittmundhafen Air Base.

Shows

A public event is organized each year by the Luftwaffe.

International twinnings

Wittmund is twinned with:
  Simsbury, Connecticut (United States)

Notable people

 Christian Alder (born 1978), footballer
 Hans-Wilhelm Müller-Wohlfahrt (born 1942), the well-known sport physician has been a sports physician of the Germany national football team since 1995 and was a sports physician of FC Bayern München from 1977–2015
 Timo Schultz (born 1977), footballer

See also
Sculpture Garden Funnix

References

Towns and villages in East Frisia
Wittmund (district)